The 2002–03 Sparta Rotterdam season was the first football) year in which the in 1888 formed club from Rotterdam had to play in the Eerste Divisie. In the previous season, the team had been relegated for the first time in history by ending up in 17th place in the Eredivisie, and fourth in the play-offs for promotion and relegation ("nacompetitie").

Manager Dolf Roks was the successor of Frank Rijkaard. During the winter break he was fired, on 22 January 2003, and replaced by Chris Dekker, who assumed office on 7 February 2003.

Matches

Eerste Divisie

Amstel Cup

Players 

|-
|}

See also 
2002–03 in Dutch football

External links 
RSSSF
Voetbal International
Sparta Info
footballdatabase

Sparta Rotterdam seasons
Sparta Rotterdam